Michael Sutton  is an American actor.

Background
Sutton was born in Los Angeles, California and graduated from Beverly Hills High School. He has a bachelor's degree in Film Production from Cal State University Northridge 1992. He was the president of Production Ardustry Entertainment in 2005 and a founding member of the Next Generation Council for the Motion Picture & Television Fund from 2003 to the present.

Sutton is best known for playing the HIV-positive teenager and AIDS victim Stone Cates on the daytime serial General Hospital.  He was nominated for a Daytime Emmy Award for Outstanding Supporting Actor in a Drama Series in 1996 for that role. It was announced that he would return to General Hospital for two episodes in 2010 and again in August 2017.

Filmography

References

External links

American male television actors
American male soap opera actors
1970 births
Living people